Zo & Mo is a UAE-born chain of optical shops owned and run by the Thumbay Group.

Background 
Zo & Mo was established in 2010 with its first outlet at GMC Hospital, Ajman. Today Zo & Mo has five outlets in the UAE; one each in the Emirates of Dubai, Sharjah & Fujairah and two in Ajman, offering a range of label frames, lenses, sunglasses, contact lenses and solutions. It operates under the Retail Division of Thumbay Group.

Zo & Mo Opticals has been among the sponsors of several health & wellness events in the UAE, like:
 Free Health Checkup Camp
 Healthy baby contest and exhibition
 Grand Doctors Meet-2012
 Annual GMC Fun Run

References

External links 
 http://www.zoandmo.com
 https://www.facebook.com/zoandmo

Optometrists
Emirati companies established in 2010
Health care companies established in 2010
Retail companies established in 2010
Health care companies of the United Arab Emirates